Hill Top is an unincorporated community in Summers County, West Virginia, United States, located  south of Hinton.

A variant name was Tophet.

References

Unincorporated communities in Summers County, West Virginia
Unincorporated communities in West Virginia